The Best Dance Album in the World... Ever! is a long-running compilation series released by Circa Records, as part of The Best... Album in the World...Ever! brand.

Track listing

Part 1 (1993)

VTDCD 17

Best Album dance in the World

Disc 1
Black Box – "Ride On Time"
2 Unlimited – "No Limit"
Haddaway – "What is Love"
Dr. Alban – "It's My Life"
Snap! – "The Power"
Technotronic – "Pump Up the Jam"
Ace of Base – "All That She Wants"
East Side Beat – "Ride Like the Wind"
Erasure – "Take a Chance on Me"
Rozalla – "Everybody's Free (To Feel Good)"
M/A/R/R/S – "Pump Up the Volume"
S'Express – "Theme from S-Express"
Heaven 17 – "Temptation" (Brothers in Rhythm Remix)
Sub Sub – "Ain't No Love (Ain't No Use)"
M People – "How Can I Love You More?"
The Shamen – "Phorever People"
The KLF – "3 AM Eternal"
Bizarre Inc – "I'm Gonna Get You"
Utah Saints – "Something Good"
Rage! – "Run to You"

Disc 2
Deee-Lite – "Groove is in the Heart" (Peanut Butter Mix)
Sister Sledge – "We Are Family" (Sure is Pure Remix Edit)
Chaka Khan – "I'm Every Woman" (Dancin' Danny D Remix)
CeCe Peniston – "Finally"
Inner City – "Big Fun"
Mantronix – "Got to Have Your Love"
The Source – "You Got the Love"
Arrested Development – "People Everyday"
Kris Kross – "Jump"
C + C Music Factory – "Gonna Make You Sweat (Everybody Dance Now)"
Soul II Soul – "Back to Life (However Do You Want Me)"
The Adventures of Stevie V – "Dirty Cash" (Radio Edit)
West End featuring Sybil – "The Love I Lost"
Incognito – "Always There"
SL2 – "On a Ragga Tip"
Shaggy – "Oh Carolina"
Shabba Ranks – "Mr. Loverman"
Kenny Thomas – "Thinking About Your Love"
Sydney Youngblood – "If Only I Could"
Soul II Soul – "Joy"

Part 2 (1993)

VTDCD 22

Disc 1
Snap! – "Rhythm Is a Dancer"
Technotronic featuring Ya Kid K – "Get Up! (Before the Night Is Over)"
2 Unlimited – "Tribal Dance"
Cappella – "U Got 2 Know"
Jazzy Jeff and the Fresh Prince – "Boom! Shake the Room"
Apache Indian – "Boom Shack-A-Lak" (Edit)
House of Pain – "Jump Around"
Urban Cookie Collective – "The Key the Secret"
The KLF – "Last Train to Trancentral" (Live From The Lost Continent)
The Shamen – "LSI (Love Sex Intelligence)"
The Prodigy – "Out of Space" (7" Edit)
Bitty McLean – "It Keeps Rainin'"
Inner Circle – "Sweat (A La La La La Long)" (Original Version)
KWS – "Please Don't Go"
SWV – "Right Here" (Human Nature Radio Mix)
Shanice – "I Love Your Smile" (Driza Bone Remix)
Soul II Soul – "Keep on Movin'"
En Vogue – "My Lovin'" (Radio Edit)
Crystal Waters – "Gypsy Woman (La Da Dee)"
Gabrielle – "Dreams"
P.M. Dawn – "Set Adrift on Memory Bliss"

Disc 2
Adamski – "Killer"
Yazz – "The Only Way Is Up"
Sabrina Johnston – "Peace" (Brothers in Rhythm Edit)
Sybil – "When I'm Good and Ready"
Gloria Gaynor – "I Will Survive" (Phil Kelsey Remix)
Coldcut featuring Lisa Stansfield – "People Hold On"
Aftershock – "Slave to the Vibe" (David Anthony Remix)
Kym Sims – "Too Blind to See It" (Hurley's "No Rap" House Mix)
Inner City – "Good Life"
Bass-O-Matic – "Fascinating Rhythm" (The Loud Edit)
Usura – "Open Your Mind"
Felix – "Don't You Want Me" (Hooj mix edit)
Oceanic – "Insanity" (Legendary Mix)
East 17 – "House of Love"
Louchie Lou & Michie One – "Shout (It Out)"
Beats International featuring Lindy Layton – "Dub Be Good to Me"
Stereo MC's – "Step It Up" (Radio Edit)
De La Soul – "The Magic Number"
Neneh Cherry – "Buffalo Stance"
Bomb the Bass – "Beat Dis"
New Order – "Regret"

Part 3 (1994)
VTDCD 32

Disc 1
M People – "Moving on Up"
D:Ream – "Things Can Only Get Better" (D:Reamix Edit)
Tony Di Bart – "The Real Thing" (The Joy Brothers Remake)
CeCe Peniston – "We Got a Love Thang"
Snap! – "Exterminate!"
Maxx – "Get-A-Way" (Airplay Mix)
2 Unlimited – "Let the Beat Control Your Body" (Airplay Edit)
Cappella – "U Got 2 Let the Music"
Haddaway – "Rock My Heart" (Radio Mix)
The Grid – "Swamp Thing" (Radio Mix)
The Good Men – "Give It Up"
Reel 2 Real – "I Like To Move It" (Radio Edit)
Aswad – "Shine"
CJ Lewis – "Sweets For My Sweet"
Salt 'N' Pepa – "Let's Talk About Sex"
K7 – "Come Baby Come" (Radio Edit)
MC Hammer – "U Can't Touch This"
Snow – "Informer" (Radio Edit)
Bitty McLean – "Dedicated to the One I Love"
Soul II Soul – "Get a Life"

Disc 2
2 Unlimited – "Get Ready For This"
Club House – "Light My Fire" (Cappella (RAF Zone) Remix Edit)
Urban Cookie Collective – "Feels Like Heaven"
Doop – "Doop"
The B-52s – "(Meet) The Flintstones" (Original LP Version) (Fred's Edit)
The Doobie Brothers – "Long Train Runnin'" (Sure Is Pure 7" Edit)
New Order – "Blue Monday" (1988 Remix)
Gloworm – "Carry Me Home" (Radio Mix)
Robin S. – "Show Me Love"
Quartz – "It's Too Late"
Eternal – "Stay"
Juliet Roberts – "Caught in the Middle (My Heart Beats Like a Drum)" (Def Classic Radio Mix)
Blue Pearl – "Naked in the Rain" (Radio Mix)
Nomad – "(I Wanna Give You) Devotion"
The Shamen – "Ebeneezer Goode" (Shamen Vocal)
Erasure – "Always" (Microbots Trance Dance Mix)
The Time Frequency – "Real Love"
49ers – "Touch Me"
Paula Abdul – "Straight Up"
East 17 – "It's Alright" (The Guvnor Mix)

Note, "Blue Monday" is actually mislabeled as the 1988 remix. It is the original 1983 12" version.

Part 4 (1994)
VTDCD 40

Disc 1
Pato Banton – "Baby Come Back"
Corona – "Rhythm of the Night"
Culture Beat – "Mr. Vain"
2 Unlimited – "The Real Thing"
The Prodigy – "No Good (Start The Dance)"
Reel 2 Real – "Go On Move" (Erick 'More' '94 Vocal Mix)
C + C Music Factory – "Things That Make You Go Hmmm..."
Gary Clail & On-U Sound System – "Human Nature"
M-Beat – "Incredible" (Radio Edit)
Cameo – "Word Up"
R. Kelly – "She's Got That Vibe"
Eternal – "Just a Step From Heaven"
M People – "One Night in Heaven"
Gwen Guthrie – "Ain't Nothin' Goin' on But the Rent"
George Michael – "Too Funky"
D:Ream – "U R the Best Thing"
K-Klass – "Rhythm is a Mystery"
China Black – "Searching" (Mykaell S. Riley Mix)
Loose Ends – "Hangin' on a String (Contemplating)"
Massive Attack – "Unfinished Sympathy"

Disc 2
Chaka Demus & Pliers – "Tease Me"
Dawn Penn – You Don't Love Me (No No No) (Original Radio Mix)
Red Dragon – "Compliments on Your Kiss"
Ace of Base – "Don't Turn Around" (7" Aswad Mix)
PJ & Duncan – "Let's Get Ready to Rhumble" (100% Radio Mix)
Maxx – "No More (I Can't Stand It)"
Cappella – "Move On Baby"
Take That – "Relight My Fire"
Frankie Goes To Hollywood – "Relax (MCMXCIII)"
Kym Mazelle & Jocelyn Brown – "No More Tears (Enough Is Enough)" (Radio Edit)
Diana Ross – "Chain Reaction"
Kim Appleby – "Don't Worry"
Jermaine Stewart – "We Don't Have To (Take Our Clothes Off)"
Black Box – "The Total Mix"
N-Trance – "Turn Up The Power"
CJ Lewis – "Everything's Alright (Uptight)"
Snap! – "Ooops Up"
Soul II Soul – "A Dream's a Dream"
Music Relief – "What's Going On"
Kylie Minogue – "Confide In Me" (Radio Mix)

Part 5 (1995)
VTDCD 40

Disc 1
Jam & Spoon – "Right In The Night (Fall In Love With Music)"
M People – "I'm Excited"
Livin' Joy – "Dreamer"
Alex Party – "Don't Give Me Your Life"
Scatman John – "Scatman"
The Outhere Brothers – "Don't Stop (Wiggle Wiggle)" 
The Bucketheads – "The Bomb! (These Sounds Fall Into My Mind) (Radio Mix)
Bobby Brown – "Humping Around"
The Nightcrawlers – "Push The Feeling On" (Radio Edit)
M.C. Sar & The Real McCoy – "Another Night"
A.D.A.M. – "Zombie!" (Eternal Airplay Mix)
Clock – "Whoomp! (There It Is) (Clock 10 To 2 Mix)"
Rednex – "Cotton Eye Joe"
Culture Beat – "Got to Get It"
Corona – "Baby Baby"
DJ Miko – "What's Up"
Deuce – "Call It Love"
N-Trance – "Set You Free" 
Perfecto Allstarz – "Reach Up" (Papa's Got A Brand New Pig Bag) (Radio Edit)
Whigfield – "Saturday Night"

Disc 2
Billy Ray Martin – "Your Loving Arms"
Strike – "U Sure Do"
Bobby Brown – "Two Can Play That Game" (K Klassik Radio Mix)
Freak Power – "Turn On, Tune In & Cop Out" 
The Chemical Brothers – "Leave Home" (Radio Edit)
Baby D – "Let Me Be Your Fantasy" (Ruffer Remix)
The Human League – "Tell Me When"
Perez Prado – "Guaglione"
Clock – "Axel F"
Jinny – "Keep Warm" (Alex Party Remix)
Grace – "Not Over Yet"
Sugarbabies – "Magic In U"
Isha D – "Stay" (Tonight)
Ini Kamoze – "Here Comes The Hotstepper"
Jodeci – "Freek 'N You"
Shaggy – "In The Summertime"
Big Mountain – "Baby, I Love Your Way"
Ace of Base – "The Sign"
Love City Groove – "Love City Groove"
East 17 – "Steam" (Vapoureyes Mix)

Reissue (2009)
A three CD reissue was released in 2009.

References

Compilation album series
Dance music compilation albums
1993 compilation albums
1994 compilation albums